The 1911 Harvard Crimson football team represented Harvard University in the 1911 college football season. The Crimson finished with a 6–2–1 record under fourth-year head coach Percy Haughton.  Walter Camp selected two Harvard players, guard Bob Fisher and halfback Percy Wendell, as first-team members of his 1911 College Football All-America Team.

Schedule

References

Harvard
Harvard Crimson football seasons
Harvard Crimson football
1910s in Boston